Barnaby Rudge is a British drama television series which originally aired on the BBC in thirteen episodes between 30 September and 23 December 1960. It was an adaptation of the 1841 novel Barnaby Rudge by Charles Dickens set against the backdrop of the 1780 Gordon Riots. The series survived the BBC's purge of the archives and was released on DVD in the USA around 2010, and later in the UK in 2017 by Simply Media. As well as being the only BBC adaptation, it remains the latest on-screen adaptation of the novel on film or television to date.

Cast

Archive status
All episodes were originally recorded on 405 line videotapes, which were later wiped or destroyed. However, 
telerecordings of all 13 episodes survived. Simply Media did not have the budget required to perform a full restoration of the copies, so the lining errors found on early videotape copies without VidFIRE restoration are prevalent, although only minor scratches and dirt are seen throughout the DVD release. The only notable exceptions are a fault in one of the earlier episodes where a line of dialogue and some brief footage are missing (most likely due to irreversible damage to the film), and the final episode, which has significantly poorer sound and picture quality than the other episodes.

Critical reception
Reviewing its DVD release, Archive Television Musings wrote "Although a handful of performances are less than effective and the story feels somewhat disjointed (it’s essentially two separate tales bolted together) Barnaby Rudge is still a serial of considerable interest. The theme of the later episodes feels eerily topical, offering a sharp change of pace from the countryside intrigues of the first half.  It’s another well-crafted Classic Serial which, despite its length, never outstays its welcome."

References

External links

1960s British drama television series
1960 British television series debuts
BBC television dramas
Films based on works by Charles Dickens
Television shows based on works by Charles Dickens